Comenius Foundation is a U.S.-based 501(c)(3) nonprofit organization that uses media to promote education and faith.  Named after pioneering educator and Moravian Bishop John Amos Comenius, the Foundation seeks to use modern media to promote the ideas of Comenius.  Comenius Foundation has helped fund development of a number of media projects including Zinzendorf, a four-part documentary miniseries that was aired on the Hallmark Channel; a German version of the program, Der Graf Ohne Grenzen (The Count Without Borders), distributed by Haenssler Verlag; the 2009 feature film Wesley starring Burgess Jenkins, June Lockhart, and Kevin McCarthy; and several informational websites such as www.changingthechannels.org.  The Foundation also provides internship opportunities for young student filmmakers.

References

External links 
Official website 
Changing the Channels Web Site
Zinzendorf Jubilee Web Site
Zinzendorf Documentary at Vision Video

Religious charities based in the United States
Charities based in North Carolina
John Amos Comenius